The 2007 U.S. Open Grand Prix was a badminton tournament which took place in Orange, California, United States from 27 August to 1 September 2007. It had a total purse of $50,000.

Tournament 
The 2007 U.S. Open Grand Prix was the fifth tournament of the 2007 BWF Grand Prix Gold and Grand Prix and also part of the U.S. Open championships which has been held since 1954. This tournament was organized by the USA Badminton and sanctioned by the BWF.

Venue 
This international tournament was held at Orange County Badminton Club in Orange, California, United States.

Point distribution 
Below is the point distribution for each phase of the tournament based on the BWF points system for the BWF Grand Prix event.

Prize money 
The total prize money for this tournament was US$50,000. Distribution of prize money was in accordance with BWF regulations.

Men's singles

Seeds 

 Shōji Satō (third round)
 Lee Tsuen Seng (champion)
 Sairul Amar Ayob (third round)
 Richard Vaughan (semi-finals)
 Andrew Dabeka (semi-finals)
 Sho Sasaki (quarter-finals)
 Bobby Milroy (third round)
 John Moody (quarter-finals)

Finals

Top half

Section 1

Section 2

Bottom half

Section 3

Section 4

Women's singles

Seeds 

 Anna Rice (quarter-finals)
 Yu Hirayama (second round)
 Pai Min-jie (semi-finals)
 Agnese Allegrini (quarter-finals)
 Jill Pittard (first round)
 Elizabeth Cann (semi-finals)
 Chie Umezu (second round)
 Kanako Yonekura (quarter-finals)

Finals

Top half

Section 1

Section 2

Bottom half

Section 3

Section 4

Men's doubles

Seeds 

 Shintaro Ikeda / Shuichi Sakamoto (first round)
 Keita Masuda / Tadashi Ōtsuka (champions)
 Michael Fuchs / Roman Spitko (quarter-finals)
 Mike Beres / William Milroy (quarter-finals)
 Jochen Cassel / Thomas Tesche (second round)
 Howard Bach / Khan Malaythong (final)
 Tony Gunawan / Raju Rai (semi-finals)
 Keishi Kawaguchi / Naoki Kawamae (semi-finals)

Finals

Top half

Section 1

Section 2

Bottom half

Section 3

Section 4

Women's doubles

Seeds 

 Aki Akao / Tomomi Matsuda (final)
 Miyuki Maeda / Satoko Suetsuna (champions)
 Fiona McKee / Charmaine Reid (second round)
 Bing Huang / Chloe Magee (second round)

Finals

Top half

Section 1

Section 2

Bottom half

Section 3

Section 4

Mixed doubles

Seeds 

 Han Sang-hoon / Hwang Yu-mi (withdrew)
 Keita Masuda / Miyuki Maeda (champions)
 Howard Bach / Eva Lee (final)
 Kennevic Asuncion / Kennie Asuncion (semi-finals)
 Mike Beres / Valerie Loker (quarter-finals)
 Lim Khim Wah / Ng Hui Lin (withdrew)
 Khan Malaythong / Mesinee Mangkalakiri (second round)
 Tadashi Ōtsuka / Satoko Suetsuna (quarter-finals)

Finals

Top half

Section 1

Section 2

Bottom half

Section 3

Section 4

References

External Links 
Tournament Link

U.S. Open
U.S. Open Grand Prix
Badminton tournaments in the United States
Sports in California